The Ligue Régionale d'Athlétisme de la Guadeloupe (LRAG) is the governing body for the sport of athletics in Guadeloupe.  Current president is Marie-José Pérec.  

As LRAG is part of the Fédération française d'athlétisme, athletes from Guadeloupe normally participate internationally for France, e.g., in European Athletics Championships as organized by the EAA.  On the other hand, Guadeloupe as a French overseas department is part of the Caribbean.  As an observer member of CACAC, Guadeloupe is invited to participate at the championships, and also at the CARIFTA Games.

History 
LRAG was founded on November 6, 1960.

Presidents
Starting with the foundation of LRAG in 1960, there were about eight presidents.

Affiliations 
Fédération française d'athlétisme (FAA)
LRAG is an observer member federation for Guadeloupe in the
Central American and Caribbean Athletic Confederation (CACAC)
LRAG is invited to participate at the 
CARIFTA Games

Regional records 
LRAG maintains the Guadeloupe records in athletics.

External links 
Official webpage
LRAG on Facebook

References 

Guadeloupe
Sports governing bodies in Guadeloupe
Athletics in Guadeloupe
Sports organizations established in 1960
1960 establishments in France
National governing bodies for athletics